Coomrith is a locality in the Western Downs Region, Queensland, Australia.

History 
The locality takes its name from the parish which in turn has named after a pastoral run whose name appears on a 1883 map.

Road infrastructure
The Meandarra Talwood Road (State Route 74) passes to the east.

References 

Western Downs Region
Localities in Queensland